Niagara West—Glanbrook was a provincial electoral district in south eastern Ontario, Canada between 2007 and 2018.  It elected one member to the Legislative Assembly of Ontario.

The riding, which was first contested in the 2007 provincial election, consisted of the municipalities of Grimsby, Pelham, West Lincoln, Lincoln and that part of Hamilton east of Glancaster Road and south of the transmission line south of Rymal Road south of the former city of Hamilton, and also south of the Niagara Escarpment east of the former city.

52.5% of the riding came from Stoney Creek, 31.5% came from Erie—Lincoln, 15.6% came from Niagara Centre and 0.2% came from Hamilton Mountain.

In 2018, the riding was dissolved into Niagara West and Flamborough—Glanbrook.

Demographics
According to the Canada 2011 Census
 Ethnic Groups: 93.3% White, 1.5% South Asian, 1.2% Aboriginal, 1.1% Black  
 Languages: 85.6% English, 2.1% Italian, 2.0% Dutch, 1.7% French, 1.5% Polish, 1.3% German 
 Religion: 76.2% Christian (32.0% Catholic, 9.6% United Church, 8.5% Anglican, 2.8% Presbyterian, 1.8% Christian Orthodox, 1.8% Baptist, 1.3% Pentecostal, 1.1% Lutheran, 17.4% Other Christian), 1.2% Muslim, 21.1% No religion. 
 Average household income: $94,033
 Median household income: $80,296
 Average individual income: $45,345
 Median individual income: $35,874

Members of Provincial Parliament

Election results

2007 electoral reform referendum

Sources

Elections Ontario Past Election Results

Former provincial electoral districts of Ontario
Grimsby, Ontario
Politics of Hamilton, Ontario